Milosav Sićović (born 12 November 1999) is a Serbian football midfielder who plays for Zlatibor Čajetina.

Club career
After he spent his youth career with Internacional Beograd, in summer 2018 he signed with Dinamo Vranje. Sićović made his official debut for Dinamo Vranje in 1 fixture match of the 2018–19 Serbian SuperLiga season against Red Star.

Career statistics

Club

References

External links
 
 Profile at srbijafudbal.com 

1999 births
People from Zemun
Living people
Serbian footballers
Association football defenders
FK Dinamo Vranje players
FK Kabel players
FK Sinđelić Beograd players
FK Radnički Niš players
FK BASK players
FK Drina Zvornik players
FK Brodarac players
FK Zlatibor Čajetina players
Serbian SuperLiga players
Serbian First League players
First League of the Republika Srpska players
Serbian expatriate footballers
Expatriate footballers in Bosnia and Herzegovina
Serbian expatriate sportspeople in Bosnia and Herzegovina